The Hualien County Council (HLCC) is the elected county council of Hualien County, Republic of China. The council composes of 33 councilors lastly elected through the 2018 Republic of China local election on 24 November 2018.

Transportation
The council building is accessible within walking distance east from Hualien Station of Taiwan Railways.

See also
 Hualien County Government

References

External links

  

County councils of Taiwan
Hualien County